Aleksandar Kocić (Serbian Cyrillic: Александар Коцић; born 18 March 1969) is a Serbian former football goalkeeper.

Playing career

Club career
Kocić played in many teams such as Vlasina, Dubočica, Vojvodina, Levante, Perugia, Empoli, Red Star Belgrade and Ethnikos Achna.

International career
He was capped 22 times with the FR Yugoslavian national team.

Kocić was set to be a participant at the 2000 UEFA European Championship but broke a toe while showering after the last practice prior to the tournament. His replacement was FK Obilić goalkeeper Milorad Korać.

Coaching career
Kocić coached Srem from 2009–2010 and ČSK Čelarevo from 2011–2012.

Serbia national football team
Kocić served as the goalkeeping coach of the Serbian national team from 2012 to 2015, having worked with Siniša Mihajlović (19 matches), Radovan Ćurčić (9 matches), Dick Advocaat (4 matches) and Ljubinko Drulović (4 matches).

Tianjin Teda
As Dragomir Okuka became the head coach of Tianjin Teda in 2016, Kocić was invited to join his coaching team as a goalkeeper coach. They showed up together in the welcome ceremony held by the club. Unfortunately, the staff left Tianjin Teda after 22 matches that didn't satisfy the club.

Changchun Yatai
When Lee Jang-soo began his second season in Changchun as the head coach, Changchun Yatai hired Kocić as the goalkeeper coach. His predecessor was Yang Jingdong, who is now the vice president of Changchun Yatai.

References

External links
 
 

1969 births
Living people
Yugoslav footballers
Serbian footballers
Serbia and Montenegro international footballers
Association football goalkeepers
FK Vojvodina players
A.C. Perugia Calcio players
Levante UD footballers
Ethnikos Achna FC players
Empoli F.C. players
Red Star Belgrade footballers
Serie A players
Serie B players
Cypriot First Division players
Serbian expatriate footballers
Serbia and Montenegro expatriate footballers
Serbia and Montenegro footballers
Expatriate footballers in Italy
Expatriate footballers in Spain
Expatriate footballers in Cyprus
People from Vlasotince
Serbia and Montenegro expatriate sportspeople in Italy
Serbia and Montenegro expatriate sportspeople in Spain
Serbia and Montenegro expatriate sportspeople in Cyprus